Lucy in the Sky is a 2012 book about a Santa Monica middle-class girl who suffers from drug addiction and alcoholism, much to the horror of her preppy brother, Cam, who is torn between loyalty and fear for her safety. The book was published anonymously with no discernible author. Released under various imprints of Simon and Schuster, the book received largely negative reviews from critics, being compared to older predecessor Go Ask Alice, which was also about drug addiction but set more-so around LSD and hippie counterculture. Lucy in the Sky is set in the modern 2000s era.

Plot
An unnamed teenage diarist recalls living with her middle-class parents and preppy brother in Santa Monica; the diarist's only friend is her brother, Cam, who receives more admiration and hopes to go to Berkeley University after high school. The two siblings, nevertheless, are close companions and share a bond by attending yoga classes. Yoga class is where the diarist meets Ross, another teenager who shares drugs with the diarist not long after her 16th birthday, during a party for said birthday. Ross remains her friend, but gets her hooked on drugs and later alcohol, leading the diarist to experiment with numerous illicit substances including marijuana, cocaine and other things. She claims to experience vivid high periods complimented with hallucinations, which only makes her even more fascinated with druggie culture and an edgy crowd of high school kids who all partake in substance abuse. The diarist stops attending school, and Cam, who has no interest in drugs, grapples with his loyalty to his sister versus the desire to report her behaviour to their parents. A 20-year-old man named Blake expresses sexual interest in the younger diarist, and snorts a line of cocaine with her. The diarist also hopes to emulate Lauren, one of the addicts in her social group. Lauren is beautiful, wealthy, wears designer clothes and has a snobby personality. The diarist's grades begin slipping, and Cam is horrified by her change in personality, as she becomes more mean-spirited and vicious. She finds that her newfound friends are more flawed than they appear to be, particularly when she is nearly raped while high and none of them are surprised by this. As time goes on, intermingled with periods of blackout drunkenness, the diarist experiments with meth and heroin. After a DUI is issued to her, she is forced to go to Alcoholics Anonymous meetings, which she hates, and to face her parents and Cam. She gets clean and sober after a length of self-reflection and more meetings, but then she relapses and dies, leaving only her diary behind.

Reception
Lucy in the Sky received mostly negative reviews from critics, who compared the book to Go Ask Alice and also considered it too ineffective and silly in its approach to the subject matter of substance abuse. Lady Reader's Bookshelf said of the book, "I really like the message in this book. I always will. I will always stand up for it. I'm not sure I care for how it was delivered. Then again, I am old school. I don't care for text speak and every other word in all capital letters. I felt the MC [main character] was a bit over the top in trying to make her point in almost everything she does. This may be typical for, say, an average teen girl. I just didn't buy it. I was annoyed with her and the repetitiveness of her actions that were not relevant to the story." Publishers Weekly stated, "echoing the theme and structure of Go Ask Alice, this inelegant cautionary tale paints an appropriately horrific picture of addiction, but offers little insight beyond what is taught in drug education programs." Kirkus Reviews appreciated the addition of the character Cam as the unnamed diarist's younger brother, stating, "Cam is one of the most compelling, and readers see him struggling to balance his loyalty to his sister against his concern for her safety", however Kirkus also disliked the book's ending, saying of it, "the book's cautionary ending feels abrupt and ineffective, perhaps because scaring readers straight was never really the point."

See also
 List of anonymously published works

References

2012 American novels
Coming-of-age fiction
American young adult novels
Novels about substance abuse
Novels about alcoholism
Novels about heroin addiction
Novels about drugs
Novels set in Santa Monica, California
Novels about siblings
Works published anonymously
Simon & Schuster books